Several ships have been named Preston:

 was an East Indiaman. She made six voyages for the British East India Company (EIC) between 1805 and 1819. In 1810 and 1811 she participated as a transport in two British military campaigns. She was sold for breaking up in 1812 but instead became a transport and a West Indiaman. She disappeared after a gale in August 1815.
 was a Dano-Norwegian vessel that the British captured c.1809. As a British merchantman she initially traded with the Iberian peninsula. An American vessel captured and released her in 1812 and she foundered later that year.
W. T. Preston was a sternwheeler that operated from 1929 to 1981 as a snagboat on rivers in Puget Sound.

Ship names